Varekil is a locality situated in Orust Municipality, Västra Götaland County, Sweden with 602 inhabitants in 2010.

References 

Populated places in Västra Götaland County
Populated places in Orust Municipality